William Porter "Spike" Shannon (February 7, 1875 – May 16, 1940) was a professional baseball player and umpire.

Shannon was an outfielder over parts of five seasons (1904–1908) with the St. Louis Cardinals, New York Giants and Pittsburgh Pirates.  He was the National League leader in runs scored in 1907, when he scored 104 runs for the Giants. For his career, he compiled a .259 batting average, 183 runs batted in, 383 runs scored, and 145 stolen bases. After his playing career, he was an umpire in the Federal League during 1914 and 1915 for a total of 177 games.

Shannon was an alumnus of Grove City College.  He was born in Pittsburgh, and later died in Minneapolis at the age of 65.

Minor and Major League Career

Spike Shannon made his major league debut on April 15, 1904 at the age of 29. Before then he toiled in the minor leagues, playing for teams like the Richmond BlueBirds of the Atlantic League, The Syracuse Stars of the Eastern League, and the St. Paul Saints of the American Association. With St. Paul he played in 135 games and batted .308 along with 41 stolen bases.

In September 1903, the St. Louis Cardinals draft Shannon from St. Paul as part of that years Rule 5 draft. In his first season in the big leagues, he played in 134 games and stole 34 bases. He batted .280 in his rookie season. His batting average fell over the course of the next two season,s though he remained a threat to steal on the base paths. On July 13, 1906, the Cardinals traded him to the Giants for catcher/outfielder Doc Marshall and OF/INF Sam Mertes. Despite having a .265 batting average in 1907, Shannon led the National League in runs scored with 104. He also led the league in at bats and plate appearances as well. 1908 would be his final season as a major league player. He struggled to start the season, and placed on waivers by the Giants. The Pittsburgh Pirates claimed him off waivers and paid the Giants $1,500 for his rights. However, he continued to slump and on September 30, 1908, he played his final game, going one for four against the St. Louis Cardinals, ironically, the very team he'd made his major league debut for a few seasons earlier.

In 694 games over five seasons, Shannon posted a .259 batting average (677-for-2613) with 383 runs, 3 home runs, 183 RBIs, 145 stolen bases and 286 bases on balls. He finished his career with a .974 fielding percentage playing at all three outfield positions.

Hoping to catch the eyes of scouts and make his way back to the big leagues, Shannon signed with the Kansas City Blues of the American Association. His batting slump continued and he retired after the 1911 season. Shannon still made another comeback at the age of 38 a few years later, this time for the Virginia Ore Diggers of the Northern League. In 52 games, the best he could muster was a .216 batting average. He retired after the 1911 season.

After his playing days were over, Shannon returned to baseball again, this time as an umpire in the Federal League, a league that would go on to sue both the American and National Leagues, accusing them of having a monopoly on major league baseball. The Federal League was hoping to become a third major, but the lawsuit drained the league of revenue and it went out of business.

Death

Spike Shannon died on May 17, 1940 at the age of 65.

See also
 List of Major League Baseball annual runs scored leaders

References

External links
, or Retrosheet
 

1875 births
1940 deaths
Grove City College alumni
Major League Baseball outfielders
Baseball players from Pittsburgh
St. Louis Cardinals players
New York Giants (NL) players
Pittsburgh Pirates players
Minor league baseball managers
Charleston Seagulls players
Richmond Bluebirds players
Syracuse Stars (minor league baseball) players
Philadelphia Athletics (minor league) players
Harrisburg Ponies players
Jersey City Skeeters players
Meriden Silverites players
Indianapolis Hoosiers (minor league) players
St. Paul Saints (Western League) players
St. Paul Saints (AA) players
Kansas City Blues (baseball) players
Virginia Ore Diggers players
Sportspeople from Pittsburgh